Zenith Data Systems, Inc. (ZDS), was a division of Zenith Electronics founded in 1979 after Zenith acquired the Heath Company, which had entered the personal computer market in 1977. Headquartered in Benton Harbor, Michigan, Zenith sold personal computers under both the Heath/Zenith and Zenith Data Systems names.

Overview

Zenith was an early partner with Microsoft, licensing all Microsoft languages for the Heath/Zenith 8-bit computers. Conversely, Microsoft programmers of the early 1980s did much of their work using Zenith Z-19 and Z-29 CRT display terminals hooked to central mainframe computers. The first Heathkit H8 computer, sold in kit form, was built on an Intel 8080 processor. It ran K7 audio-tape software, punched tape software (with puncher/reader H10) and HDOS (Heath Disk Operating System) software on 5¼" hard-sectored floppy disks. The CP/M operating system was adapted to all Heath/Zenith computers, in 1979. Next, the early Heath/Zenith computers (H88/H89 and Z-89) were based on the Z80 processors and ran either HDOS or CP/M operating systems.

ZDS's first computers were preassembled versions of Heathkit computers. As subsidiary of a television company, ZDS could obtain monitors at cost. It continued selling computers in kit form—the equivalent of the ZDS Z-150 IBM PC compatible was the Heathkit H-150, for example—and opened more Heathkit Electronic Centers while also selling through Zenith dealers and seeking corporate customers. The company also continued Heath's practice of publishing unusually clear product documentation, distributing schematics, and selling the source code to HDOS and other software in printed form.

ZDS introduced the Z-100, its first computer not based on a kit design and second 16-bit product after the H11 minicomputer, in early 1982. Targeted for professionals, it had an S-100 bus, high performance color graphics, an 8-bit Z80 and an 8088 processor. It could either boot the CP/M operating system, or Z-DOS, a modified OEM version of MS-DOS that was not fully PC compatible. (In particular, the floppy-disks were not IBM-PC compatible).  Later machines (Z-150, Z-2xx, Z-3xx, et al.) were PC compatible.

ZDS avoided the retail consumer market, instead focusing on business and government customers, such as companies, universities, and government agencies; an executive said, "We'd like to have [retailers], but we don't need them." The company stated in 1982 "We have no expectations of being first or second in the desktop market", but in fiscal 1984 sold 16% of the 37,000 computers the United States government purchased, second to IBM's 27%, and by 1985 was overall the second-largest PC-compatible company after Compaq. ZDS's CEO that year attributed its success to recognizing, unlike other computer companies, that the PC compatible was a commodity with falling prices like televisions: "Basically, we move boxes". ZDS's 1985 revenue grew to $352 million, and in March 1986 The New York Times called the division's success one of Zenith's "proudest accomplishments" amid the company's losses in the television market against Japanese competition.

First in large volume laptop computers, Heath / Zenith pioneered the laptop computer market in 1985, with "lunchbox" portable computer Z-171, the first MS-DOS based small portable computer fit with two 5-1/4" floppy disks and blue LCD screen, that was built for Heath / Zenith by Vadem Corp. under an OEM agreement, and first purchased in large numbers (20,000) by the U.S. Internal Revenue Service for use by their field audit agents that worked at company sites auditing businesses. Next, in 1987, followed the Intel 8088-based Zenith 181 and Zenith 183, the latter being one of the first laptops to be equipped with a hard disk. The U.S. Air Force followed with an initial purchase of 46,000 laptops from Zenith.

ZDS at that time believed government was a more important customer than consumers or even businesses.  In October 1983, the United States Navy and Air Force awarded a $27 million computer contract to ZDS. In 1984 ZDS won a $100 million contract with the United States military for Tempest-shielded computers. In 1986 it won two other large contracts, one for portable computers for the Internal Revenue Service, and a $242 million contract—the largest in history—for 90,000 computers to the United States Department of Defense.

In October 1989, Zenith sold ZDS to the French company Groupe Bull for $635 million. Two key reasons for the ZDS/Groupe Bull merger with Packard Bell were the cost of repairs and cost of software upgrades for a large US government contract. ZDS lost a lot of money as a result of the US Air Force contract Desktop IV. In order to meet the price point for the contract, ZDS made very cheap computers with motherboards which were frequently defective out of the box and required on-site service, often by a third party which billed ZDS, to resolve the issue. The Air Force also insisted on making ZDS pay for the upgrade to Windows 95 on 200,000 of the machines since ZDS had agreed to provide software upgrades for the computers for free. Groupe Bull continued to sell personal computers under the Zenith Data Systems name until 1996 when ZDS merged with Packard Bell and NEC, creating the company Packard Bell NEC Inc.

The follow-on SupersPort was substantially larger and heavier, but provided much-improved performance through the use of the Intel 80286 processor. It was selected by the US Army and Navy in one of the first major government purchases of laptop computers. Later another version (Zenith SupersPort SX) used an Intel 80386 processor.

The later MinisPORT was the only laptop to ever use the 2-inch floppy disk, developed for use in still video cameras.

One unique feature of most Zenith PC-compatibles was the key combination , which would interrupt the running program and break into a machine-language monitor. This monitor PAM 8 program originated with the Heathkit H8 computer, included in ROM, allowed the user to trace or resume program execution, change machine settings, run diagnostic routines, or boot from a specific device.

Later models of Zenith computers, laptops in particular, included a MACHINE.EXE program, which allowed the user to change hardware-specific settings from within other programs (such as batch files). This amenity was highly advanced for its time, with standards like APM and ACPI providing similar functionality in modern systems.

ZDS were well known in the UK for sponsoring the Full Members Cup, a football competition, for several years until its discontinuation in 1992.

Zenith sold Pentium clones under the Z-Station name.

Models and variants

Terminals 
 Heathkit H-9 (1977)
 Heathkit HTX-10
 Heathkit H-19 (1980)
 Heathkit H-29/Zenith Z-29 (1983)
 Zenith Z-39 (1985)

Desktop computers 
 Heathkit H8 (1977)
 Heathkit H11 (1978)
 Heathkit H-88 (1979)
 Heathkit H-89/Zenith Z-89 (1979)
 Zenith Z-100 series (Z-110 and Z-120)
 Zenith Z-141
 Zenith Z-148
 Zenith Z-150 series (Z-151, 157, 158, 159, etc.)
 Zenith Z-240 series (Z-241, 248, etc.)
 Zenith Z-286 series (Z-286, 286LP, etc.)
 Zenith Z-386 series (Z-386, 386SX, etc.)
 Zenith Eazy PC (1987)
 Zenith ZDE-1217-A0 (1989) (8088) 
 Zenith ZDH-1217-B0
 Zenith ZF-148-42 (8088)

Portable computers 

 IBM ThinkPad 300
 Zenith ZP-150
 Zenith Z-171 (1985)
 Zenith Z-180 series
 Zenith SlimsPORT 286 (1986)
 Zenith SupersPort (1987)
 Zenith TurbosPort 386 (1988)
 Zenith SupersPort SX (1989)
 Zenith MinisPort ZL-1, ZL-2 (1989)
 Zenith Z-Lite 320L
 Zenith Z-Lite 320Lb
 Zenith Z-Lite Z-425L (1992-1993)
 Zenith ZFL-181-93 (1993)
 Zenith Z-Star 433 series / Packard Bell Statesman (1993) — model with J-Mouse pointing
 Zenith Z-Star EX NTB007 (1994)
 Zenith Z-Star ES
 Zenith Z-Star 700
 Zenith Z-Note 325L

References

External links

Terminals Wiki: Zenith Z-19
Terminals Wiki: Zenith Z-29
obsoletecomputermuseum.org
computinghistory.org.uk

 
Heathkit
1979 establishments in Michigan
1996 disestablishments in Michigan
1989 mergers and acquisitions
1996 mergers and acquisitions
American companies established in 1979
American companies disestablished in 1996
Benton Harbor, Michigan
Computer companies established in 1979
Computer companies disestablished in 1996
Defunct computer companies of the United States
Defunct computer hardware companies